The Saint Helena petrel (Pseudobulweria rupinarum), also known as the Saint Helena gadfly petrel or large Saint Helena petrel, was a species of seabird in the family Procellariidae.  It was endemic to the island of Saint Helena in the South Atlantic Ocean.  It most likely became extinct after overpredation by people.

External links
BirdLife species factsheet
Pterodroma rupinarum

Saint Helena petrel
†
Extinct birds of Atlantic islands
Bird extinctions since 1500
Saint Helena petrel
Saint Helena petrel
Taxonomy articles created by Polbot
Taxobox binomials not recognized by IUCN